Rami Hietaniemi (born 28 December 1982 in Perho) is a male wrestler from Finland.  He is a Greco-Roman wrestler who competes in the men's -84 kg division.

External links
 

Living people
1982 births
Finnish male sport wrestlers
Olympic wrestlers of Finland
Wrestlers at the 2012 Summer Olympics
Wrestlers at the 2016 Summer Olympics
World Wrestling Championships medalists
European Wrestling Championships medalists
20th-century Finnish people
21st-century Finnish people